Ann Gillespie is a retired American actress who became an Episcopal priest, and is currently the Senior Associate Rector at Church of Holy Comforter in Vienna, Virginia.

She is perhaps best known for her recurring role as Jackie Taylor, mother to Kelly Taylor on the original Beverly Hills, 90210. She reprised the role during the first 2 seasons of 90210 as mother to both Kelly [Taylor] and Erin [Silver]. Gillespie also appeared in one episode of the first season of Gilmore Girls, playing Paris Geller's mother.

Gillespie made her acting debut in 1981 when she became the second actress to portray Siobhan Ryan Novak on Ryan's Hope, replacing actress Sarah Felder, who originated the role. Gillespie played the role for one year before she was replaced by Marg Helgenberger.  In 1984, she appeared in a pilot, "The Sheriff and the Astronaut," opposite Alec Baldwin.

Gillespie is a graduate of Dwight Morrow High School in Englewood, New Jersey. In 2003 she earned her B.A. at Goddard College in Vermont. She has two children.

References

External links

Living people
American soap opera actresses
American television actresses
Goddard College alumni
21st-century American actresses
20th-century American actresses
American Episcopal priests
Year of birth missing (living people)
Dwight Morrow High School alumni
People from Englewood, New Jersey
Actresses from New Jersey